All Sides is the sixth studio album by O.A.R., which was released on July 15, 2008 by Everfine Records, Lava Records and Atlantic Recording Corporation. It is the band's first album recorded with touring keyboardist Mikel Paris.

Song Details 
Marc Roberge revealed in an interview with Songfacts that "Dinner Last Night" was inspired by an episode of Seinfeld.

Track listing

Critical reception 

The album was generally received negatively among professional reviewers. Rolling Stone attributes the album's failure to a change in the group's style, calling the album "a poor man's Goo Goo Dolls". Allmusic claims, "O.A.R. wasn't designed for Top 40 radio, which makes All Sides...disappointing."

Chart positions 
The album was the band's highest charting prior to the release of King, debuting at No. 13 on the Billboard 200 with approximately 33,000 copies sold in its first week.

Personnel
O.A.R.
 Chris Culos - drums, percussion
 Benj Gershman - bass guitar
 Richard On - electric guitar, background vocals
 Marc Roberge - lead vocals, acoustic guitar, electric guitar
 Jerry DePizzo - saxophone, electric guitar, percussion

Additional personnel
 Mikel Paris - keyboards, percussion, background vocals
 Rob Cavallo - additional electric guitar and production on "Shattered"
 Jamie Muhoberac - additional keyboards on "Shattered"
 Dorian Crozier - programming and percussion on "Shattered"
 Suzie Katayama - violin and string arrangement on "One Day"
 Joel Derouin - violin and concert master on "One Day"
 Charlie Bisharat - violin on "One Day"
 Mario De Leon - violin on "One Day"
 Alyssa Park - violin on "One Day"
 Andrew Duckles - viola on "One Day"
 Matt Funes - viola on "One Day"
 Larry Corbett - cello on "One Day"
 Steve Richards - cello on "One Day"

Notes 

O.A.R. albums
2008 albums
Albums produced by Matt Wallace